Rod Carrillo and Ronnie Sumrall are a British-American house music duo. They have been producing and writing music together since 2007, after they met in Los Angeles. They released a full-length album in 2010 entitled Rhythm, after the success of their previous singles.

They are perhaps best known for their songs: "Moonshine Rising", "Long Time" and "Breakin' Out",

Discography
2010 - One Night - Rod Carrillo and Ronnie Sumrall
2010 - Prelude - Rod Carrillo and Ronnie Sumrall
2010 - Eyes on Me - Rod Carrillo and Ronnie Sumrall
2010 - Breakin' Out - Rod Carrillo and Ronnie Sumrall
2010 - Achilles Heel - Rod Carrillo and Ronnie Sumrall
2010 - Doin' Better - Rod Carrillo and Ronnie Sumrall
2010 - It's Not Like You - Rod Carrillo and Ronnie Sumrall
2010 - Let It go - Rod Carrillo and Ronnie Sumrall
2010 - Oh Yeah - Rod Carrillo and Ronnie Sumrall
2010 - Long Time - Rod Carrillo and Ronnie Sumrall (US Dance #23)
2010 - Rhythm - Rod Carrillo and Ronnie Sumrall
2009 - Moonshine Rising - Rod Carrillo and Ronnie Sumrall (US Dance #25)
2009 - Save Me - Carrillo & Amador feat. Ronnie Sumrall

References

External links
Ronnie Sumrall Website
Carrillo Music

British electronic music groups
American electronic music groups
Remixers
British house music groups